Theodore William Banker is a former professional American football player who played guard for six seasons for the Cleveland Browns and New York Jets.

Banker attended Southeast Missouri State University where he was a four-year letterman in football. He won all MIAA honors and was team captain for 1981 and 1982, and was team MVP in 1982.

Banker played in the NFL as an offensive lineman for six years, four with the New York the Jets (#63) and two with the Cleveland Browns 

Banker is the only player in NFL history to play at all five offensive line positions in the same season (Center, Left- and Right-Offensive Guard, Left- and Right-Offensive Tackle).

1961 births
Living people
Sportspeople from Belleville, Illinois
Players of American football from Illinois
American football offensive guards
Southeast Missouri State Redhawks football players
Cleveland Browns players
New York Jets players
People from Millstadt, Illinois